"Madness" is a song by the English rock band Muse. It is the second track and second single from Muse's sixth studio album, The 2nd Law (2012), released as a download on 20 August 2012. It was written by singer and guitarist Matthew Bellamy and produced by the band. The music video premiered on 5 September 2012.

"Madness" spent 19 weeks at number one on Billboards Alternative Songs chart, becoming the second-longest-running number-one song on the chart. The song earned a nomination in the Best Rock Song category at the 2013 Grammy Awards.

Background and writing
"Madness" is an electronic rock, synth-pop, soft rock, and R&B song. According to NME, "Madness" draws influences from Queen's "I Want to Break Free", George Michael's "Faith" and some instrumental elements of his other hit "I Want Your Sex". During a preview of The 2nd Law on French site Jeuxactu, the song was said to resemble Depeche Mode and described as "calm, languid and sweet". Matthew Bellamy stated that the song started as a personal reflection after a fight with his girlfriend Kate Hudson, and how, after she had gone to her mother's house, he began to realise "yeah, she was right, wasn't she?" In a separate interview, Bellamy stated the song was the band's attempt to strip down the sound of the album, and that the song has its roots in twelve-bar blues with gospel, soul and R&B influences. He went on to conclude that, "It's the song I'm probably most proud of on the album for sure."

Music video
The "Madness" music video was uploaded to Muse's YouTube channel on 5 September 2012. This video saw the second collaboration between the band and director Anthony Mandler, who previously directed the music video for "Neutron Star Collision (Love Is Forever)". It was edited by Jacquelyn London. The director of photography was David Devlin. The video was filmed on the Red Line platform at Los Angeles Union Station. The two main characters are played by models Erin Wasson and Max Silberman.

Release and reception
"Madness" was released as a download on 20 August 2012, with an accompanying lyric video for the song being uploaded shortly after. NME described the song as "taking the defining noise of 'bass music' and using it to create slinky, soft rock sex music." The track review goes on to call it a brilliant single and states that Muse have "tamed the shark" following their declaration that Muse had jumped the shark with "Survival". Diffuser.fm noted that the single "doesn't sound like the Muse that established itself as one of the world's biggest rock bands" but that "the unusual blend of sounds works far better than it probably should", giving the track 8/10.

Rolling Stone stated that the single sees Muse "swap bombastic bass brutality with wubby subtleties as Matthew Bellamy croons over a surprisingly gentle pop track." Radio Times described it as "George Michael's "Faith" underwater". In a negative review of the song, Robert Myers of The Village Voice wrote that "the band's U2 imitation has finally caught up to Achtung Baby and Zooropa". He further added that Muse "gets the surface details right but lacks the emotional and intellectual foundation to get at their inspiration's essence." Rolling Stone named the song the 37th best song of 2012. Chris Martin of Coldplay described the single as "Muse's best song yet".

"Madness" spent 19 weeks at the summit of Billboards Alternative Songs chart, making it the longest running number-one song on the chart, beating the previous record of 18 weeks set by Foo Fighters' "The Pretender". The record was later broken again by Portugal. The Man's "Feel It Still" in 2017, which spent 20 weeks at the number-one spot. "Madness" was nominated for Best Rock Song at the 2013 Grammy Awards, but lost to "Lonely Boy" by the Black Keys.

Commercial performance
"Madness" had a positive commercial performance, charting in several countries and peaking within the top 10 in Belgium (Wallonia), Iceland, Israel, Italy, Japan, Portugal, and South Korea. In the band's home country of the United Kingdom, the song peaked at number 25 on the UK Singles Chart. In the United States, the song peaked at number 45 on the Hot 100 and number three on the Hot Rock Songs chart. It topped the Alternative Songs chart for 19 weeks, breaking the record for the longest-reigning number-one song on the chart, which was previously held by "The Pretender" by Foo Fighters. That record later got overtaken by Portugal. The Man's "Feel It Still" in 2017 which spent 20 weeks at the number-one spot. "Madness" has been certified gold by the IFPI in Switzerland, platinum by the MC in Canada and FIMI in Italy, and double-platinum by the RIAA in the United States.

Track listing

Charts

Weekly charts

Year-end charts

Certifications

See also
List of number-one Billboard Alternative Songs of 2012
List of number-one Billboard Alternative Songs of 2013

References

External links
 

2012 singles
2012 songs
Muse (band) songs
Music videos directed by Anthony Mandler
Rock ballads
Synth-pop ballads
Songs written by Matt Bellamy